In data compression and the theory of formal languages, the smallest grammar problem is the problem of finding the smallest context-free grammar that generates a given string of characters (but no other string). The size of a grammar is defined by some authors as the number of symbols on the right side of the production rules.
Others also add the number of rules to that. The (decision version of the) problem is NP-complete.
The smallest context-free grammar that generates a given string is always a straight-line grammar without useless rules.

See also

 Grammar-based code
 Kolmogorov Complexity
 Lossless data compression

References 

 

Formal languages
Data compression